Asterospicularia is a genus of soft corals in the family Xeniidae.

Species
The World Register of Marine Species lists the following species:

Asterospicularia laurae Utinomi, 1951
Asterospicularia randalli Gawel, 1976

References

Xeniidae
Octocorallia genera